The Strange Idols Pattern and Other Short Stories is the third album by English alternative rock band Felt, released in 1984 and produced by John Leckie. The album marked a departure from the introspective, guitar-led sound of their first two albums, with Lawrence's vocals becoming much more dominant in the mix along with a greater emphasis on pop melodies. The album also introduced a traditional drum kit to the band's sound, having previously relied on tom drums in the past.

Tracks 2, 4 and 7 are instrumental. "Sunlight Bathed the Golden Glow" is different from the single version. "Whirlpool Vision of Shame" is a re-recording of earlier single "My Face is on Fire", with new lyrics.

Track listing
All songs written by Lawrence and Maurice Deebank. "Crucifix Heaven" was omitted from some reissues of the album.

Personnel
Felt
Lawrence – vocals, rhythm guitar
Maurice Deebank – lead guitar
Mick Lloyd – bass guitar
Gary Ainge – drums
Production
John Leckie – production

References 

Felt (band) albums
1984 albums
Albums produced by John Leckie
Cherry Red Records albums